Veermata Jijabai Technological Institute (VJTI) (Marathi : वीरमाता जिजाबाई टेक्नॉलोजिकल इन्स्टिट्यूट) is a state funded college located in Mumbai, Maharashtra, India, and one of the oldest engineering colleges in Asia. Founded in 1887 and formerly known as the Victoria Jubilee Technical Institute, it adopted its present name on 26 January 1997. VJTI is an academically and administratively autonomous institute, but it is affiliated to the University of Mumbai. The institute is financially supported by the Government of Maharashtra.

After being awarded academic and administrative autonomy in 2004, VJTI became operational under the administration of a board of governors. VJTI is also the Central Technical Institute of Maharashtra State. The institute trains students in engineering and technology at the certificate, diploma, degree, post-graduate and doctoral levels.

History

Foundation and early years (1887–1960)
The institute was founded in 1887 and commenced with two departments, the Sir J. J. School of Mechanical Engineering and the Ripon Textile School.

Development and post-autonomy (1960–present)
Prior to 1960, Victoria Jubilee Technical Institute was the only institute offering Engineering degree and postgraduate courses under the University of Bombay and enjoyed de facto autonomy. In 1997, the institute was renamed to Veermata Jijabai Technological Institute.

The institute was granted financial and academic autonomy from 21 June 2004. As a result, the autonomous VJTI has implemented a revised syllabus for its students in June 2004 at the undergraduate and postgraduate levels by implementing a credit system. The revised scheme of examinations, which follows a grading system and letter grade point system has been implemented. An important part of curriculum is the practically oriented project at the final year of graduation and the dissertations offered by the postgraduate students, as also the in-plant training undergone by the third year diploma students.

Significant changes under autonomy are the setting up of Distance Education Programmes (DEP) with IIT Bombay, with VJTI being a Remote Centre; as also the modernization of the library to a digital library. Postgraduate students may see the journals online throughout the week, with facility for printing. Several students societies, inter-college festivals, and the college magazine 'Nirmaan' serve as a platform to enhance students personality. VJTI initiated a newsletter named 'VJ.News' in March 2010.

Under a World Bank grant, the Technical Education Quality Improvement Programme (TEQIP), a modernization will offer central computing facilities to students, who will also have access to improved laboratory and workshop facilities. The faculty at the institute runs testing and consultancy work. Industries has sponsored laboratories - for instance, the high voltage laboratory, courtesy Siemens; and the Computational Fluid Dynamics laboratory, courtesy Bhabha Atomic Research Centre.

Individual students profiles through departmental brochures are centrally positioned with the 'Training and Placement Office' of the institute. The office liaises with over hundred companies and places students for employment and in-plant training through campus recruitment programmes. In 2010, VJTI added Electronics & Telecommunication Engineering to its list of streams.

VJTI was conferred with the title of 'Knowledge Partner' for the upcoming Centre of Excellence of Sports Textiles of Government of India.

Organisation and administration

Governance 
At the institutional level, VJTI is governed by a board of governors with a chairman, the director as a member and other members of the board. Members include heads of industry, prominent VJTI alumni as well as heads of other educational institutions.

The key people in the execution of the institute's activities are the director, who is assisted by the Dean (Academic Programs), Dean (Students Activities), Dean (Resource Mobilization & Finance) and Dean (Research & Development), and the heads of the departments.

Departments 
The institute has 12 academic departments. Of these, nine offer certificate, diploma, degree, postgraduate and/or doctoral programs. These are:
 Civil & Environmental Engineering Department
 Structural Engineering Department
 Computer Engineering & Information Technology Department
  Master in Computer Applications (MCA) Department
 Electrical Engineering Department
 Mechanical Engineering Department
 Production Engineering Department
 Textile Manufactures Department
 Technical & Applied Chemistry Department

Three academic departments have supporting roles and conduct foundation courses for degree and diploma programs, but do not offer any programs of their own. These are:
 Mathematics Department
 Physics Department
 Humanities & Management Department

Academics

Admissions 
 Admissions for undergraduate degree courses are based on the scores in the MHT-CET only 
The admission process is carried out separately by Directorate of Technical Education along with 5 other autonomous institutes in Maharashtra. Respective admission rounds are known as CAPAI (Centralized Admission Process to Autonomous Institutes).
 Admissions for undergraduate diploma courses are based on scores in the Class 10 Board Examination.
 M.C.A. admissions are based on the scores in the MCA-CET.
 Admissions for postgraduate engineering courses are through GATE or sponsorship.

Rankings

Veermata Jijabai Technological Institute was ranked 119th among engineering colleges by the National Institutional Ranking Framework (NIRF) in 2022.

Student life

Student societies 
AeroVJTI

AeroVJTI is the official aero-modelling and aircraft designing club of VJTI, Mumbai, started in 2014. It has achieved incredible feats throughout the years in competitions like SAE Aero Design, FFD (Future Flight Design) and AIAA D/B/F (American Institute of Aeronautics and Astronautics Design/Build/Fly). They won the Best Design Report Award and stood 7th overall in AIAA D/B/F 2017 and stood 1st in Asia and 5th globally in AIAA D/B/F 2019.

They conduct various workshops throughout the year. Aquila is the aircraft manufacturing workshop conducted for the Freshers where they construct and fly an airplane all by themselves. They also conduct Pratigya for underprivileged children in schools all over the city and a glider workshop for school children.

VJTI Racing 

VJTI Racing is the institute's very own automotive club established in the 2008. The club aims to provide practical and application based learning to the students of VJTI by enabling them to design and manufacture fully functional prototype vehicles. 
Each year a team participates in national/international level competitions wherein they design, machine, fabricate, assemble and test their very own automobile. This is done using the very same concepts and theory provided in the classrooms. The students also gain first-hand experience in team management, budgeting and managing finances.

Over the years VJTI Racing has participated in various competitions of great repute, which include M-Baja SAE India, Supra, EcoKart, ESVC, M-Baja South Africa. For the year 2021-22, the members of the club are participated in e-BAJA SAEINDIA 2022, and manufactured a single-seater electric off-road vehicle with an all-wheel drive system.

The club annually conducts various workshops on various design, modelling and analysis software which empower the students of VJTI to be technically sound before entering the industry.
The motto of the club is "Drive to Win" - symbolizing the efforts, passion and the sheer grit of the club members to make exemplary vehicles that never fail them.

Society of Robotics & Automation 

Started in September 2008, the Society of Robotics And Automation (SRA). is a student's society which focuses on innovation in Robotics, Machine vision, Automation and the allied fields. SRA aims to create awareness and promote robotics among students at VJTI and other leading colleges in Mumbai.
SRA's vision is to Ideate, Innovate and Inspire.
The student society works in the field of robotics and automation. Senior student members train and assist students to undertake projects, participate in competitions, undertake industrial and research projects. Students organize various competitions like Algocon, Labyrinth, Autosim Challenge for the junior members of the society. A mentorship program run by the society is Eklavya. Avitra is a flagship project of the society. SRA's projects can be viewed on GitHub.

A team of Students from the Society of Robotics and Automation bagged second prize in 7th Delta International Smart and Green Manufacturing Contest organized by China where they represented India globally. Another team won Round 1 of the DRDO Golden Jubilee Students Competition organised by the DRDO in association with the ADE, for which they received a cash prize of Rs. 50,000. They were one of ten teams to represent their institute at Round 2 held in Bangalore in May 2009. The students of SRA also represent VJTI in ROBOCON (Asia-Pacific Robot Contest), were ranked 9th in Robocon 2011 and won an award for the 'Most Economical Robot' in the same year.

Debate & Literary Arts Society 

The Debate & Literary Arts Society, known as the DLA, is a VJTI student organization under the Humanities & Management Department. The DLA's activities include the VJTI newsletter (VJ.News), debates, quizzes and the flagship VJTI Model United Nations (VJMUN), which attracts participants from all over the nation. Besides these, the DLA also organizes regular seminars and lectures on economics, literature, creative writing, etc. DLA also conducts fortnightly Book Club sessions, an annual Open Mic and more. Its committee is led by two secretaries who are appointed by the institute every academic year.

Entrepreneurship Cell 
The Entrepreneurship Cell (E-Cell) of VJTI conducts events, workshops and seminars that aim to develop the management acumen and stimulate the entrepreneurial spirit in students. It conducts stand alone events ('Mandi' being a popular one) as well as management based sectors in Pratibimb, Technovanza and Enthusia, the three festivals of VJTI.

Annual festivals

Rangawardhan 
Rangawardhan is a four-day Annual Marathi Extravaganza of VJTI Mumbai , dedicated to promoting Marathi drama, literature, music,dance and other art forms. It conducts performances, exhibitions, seminars,competitions,talk shows and concerts during the month of December.It's one of the largest marathi cultural college festival.

Technovanza 
Technovanza is the 3-day national-level annual techno-management festival of VJTI, organized by the students on a non-profit basis. It consists of competitions, exhibitions, workshops, and seminars on robotics, programming, and other technical, management, and social sectors; along with entertainment programs which usually have a technical basis.

Alumni

VJTI Alumni Association
Formed in March 1944, the VJTI Alumni Association was formerly known as the VJTI Old Boys' Association. In 1973 the association was given its current name, and was formally registered with the Charities Commissioner under the Societies Registration Act, 1860. The revival of the Alumni Association was spurred at Blueprint 2020, held in April 2004 with the encouragement of the then Principal and Secretary.

Departmental alumni bodies 
Several departments have their own alumni bodies which also conduct annual departmental alumni meets. These include Textile Alumni Meet (TAM) and Production Past Students Association. VJTI Hostels also conducts an annual alumni meet.

Notable alumni

 Sekhar Basu, Indian nuclear scientist; chairman, Atomic Energy Commission of India; former Director of the Bhabha Atomic Research Centre
 Shakuntala Bhagat, First woman civil engineer in India, bridge designer
 Chaggan Bhujbal, former Deputy Chief Minister, Government of Maharashtra studied LME(I)
 Deepakbhai Desai, spiritual leader, Akram Vignan Movement
 Utpal Dholakia, Indian American researcher and professor
 Pirojsha Burjorji Godrej, founder of Godrej Group
 Vijay Gupchup, former Pro Vice Chancellor of the University of Mumbai; former Chairman of the Research Council of Structural Engg. Research Centre in Chennai; former chairman of the National Board of Accreditation, AICTE, New Delhi
 Anil Kakodkar, former Chairman of Atomic Energy Commission of India
 Yashavant Kanetkar, Indian computer science author, known for his books on programming languages
 Rakesh Khanna, Syntel Chief Operating Officer since January 2012
 Vaman Srinivas Kudva, founder director of Syndicate Bank
 Jagdish Chandra Mahindra, founder of Mahindra & Mahindra
 Dhansukhlal Mehta, Gujarati writer
 Sriram Parasuram, carnatic and Hindustani voco-violinist
 Jayant Patil, State chief of NCP; former home minister; former Minister of Finance and Planning; former Minister of Rural Development, Government of Maharashtra 
 Renuka Ramnath, founder and CEO of Multiples Private Equity; former CEO of ICICI Ventures
 Avtar Saini, former Director for South Asia Region, Intel; a pioneer of the Pentium-series processors
 Potti Sreeramulu, freedom fighter; fasted until death for the formation of new state for Telugu people
 Mohan Lal Sukhadia, 5th Chief Minister of Rajasthan
 Shankar Subbanarasayya Mantha, former Chairman, All India Council for Technical Education (AICTE)
 Dhairya Dand, Indian-born New York City based inventor and artist.

References

External links 

 

All India Council for Technical Education
Engineering colleges in Mumbai
Veermata Jijabai Technological Institute
Educational institutions established in 1887
Affiliates of the University of Mumbai
1887 establishments in India